Robert Brooke Albertson (December 21, 1859 – October 3, 1917) was an American politician in the state of Washington. He served in the Washington House of Representatives. From 1901 to 1903, he was the Speaker of that body.

References

Republican Party members of the Washington House of Representatives
1859 births
1917 deaths
19th-century American politicians